Ernest Saves Christmas is a 1988 American Christmas comedy film directed by John Cherry and starring Jim Varney. This is the third film to feature Varney's character Ernest P. Worrell, the most commercially successful film in the Ernest franchise, and chronicles Ernest's attempt to help find a replacement for an aging Santa Claus.

Plot

A man claiming to be Santa Claus arrives in Orlando, Florida, where Ernest P. Worrell is working as a taxicab driver. Ernest picks up Santa, who tells him he is on his way to inform a local celebrity named Joe Carruthers that he has been chosen to be the new Santa Claus. Joe hosted a long-running, but recently-cancelled local children's program with emphasis on manners and integrity, which Ernest remembers fondly.

While they are driving, a runaway teenage girl who says she is named Harmony Starr joins Ernest and Santa in the taxicab. When they get to their destination, Santa possesses no legal currency (only play money), so Ernest lets him ride for free which gets Ernest fired from his job. Ernest discovers that Santa left his magic sack in the taxicab, and Ernest begins a quest to find the old man and return it to him.

At the Orlando Children's Museum, Santa tries talking to Joe, but is interrupted and rebuffed by Joe's rude agent Marty Brock. Santa begins to worry when he discovers his sack is missing, and becomes discouraged because of his increasing forgetfulness, a result of being 151 years old. Santa tries to explain his predicament, but Marty refuses to believe and help him, and has him arrested. Ernest poses as an employee of the governor with Harmony as the governor's niece, and the two help Santa escape from jail by convincing the police chief that Santa must be taken to a mental hospital. Santa explains to Ernest and Harmony that he was handed down the job of Santa Claus in 1889 and has enjoyed it ever since, but the magic grows weaker over time. The only way to restore its full strength is to pass it on to someone else which is why he must find Joe and make him the new Santa Claus by 7:00 PM. Ernest disguises himself as a snake rancher so he can sneak Santa into a movie studio. Marty presses Joe to quit his focus on teaching children goodness and instead land a part in a horror film titled Christmas Slay, about an alien which terrorizes children on Christmas Eve, a concept that offends Santa so deeply he punches the director.

Meanwhile, while all these events are taking place, two holding dock workers receive several large crates marked for release to "Helper Elves".  The two dock workers argue over the shipping papers and the contents of the crates.  The crates are revealed to contain flying reindeer.  The dock workers seek help from the local animal control services only to be told that there is nothing animal control can do to help when they arrive and are shocked to see the reindeer walking on the ceiling of the warehouse.

Santa later tracks down Joe at his home. He explains about passing the position of Santa Claus over to him because otherwise the magic will eventually die. Santa also explains that from Orlando, Joe must leave to deliver the presents by 7:00 PM; if he leaves any later, he will run into daylight before he finishes. Joe declines, but later is overcome by conscience when the film director wants him to use foul language, which he refuses to say in front of the children on the set.

Ernest and Harmony (whose real name is later revealed by Santa to be Pamela Trenton) discover the magic power of Santa's sack, and Pamela starts to abuse it. She steals the sack, and attempts to run away again. However, on Christmas Eve, her conscience prevails, and she rushes back to find Ernest and Santa and return the sack. Ernest meets Santa's elves at the airport and they retrieve the reindeer from the dock workers and Santa's sleigh from the holding dock. Because they are short on time, Ernest decides to fly the sleigh to the children's museum, much to the helpers' objection. Having trouble controlling it at first, the reindeer and the sleigh fly all over the sky. At a meeting, Joe sees the reindeer and sleigh flying and it convinces him that everything Santa told him is real. Joe turns down the acting job and leaves to find Santa.

Joe finds Santa at 6:57 PM at the children's museum and tells Santa that he wants the job. Very pleased, Santa transforms Joe into the new Santa Claus. The new Santa uses his new magic to make it snow in Orlando. Ernest and the helpers arrive at the museum at 6:58 PM. Pamela has called her mother and has decided to come home. The new Santa decides to have Pamela be his special helper and then take her to her home, and allows Ernest to be the sleigh driver for the night. The old Santa resumes his former identity, Seth Applegate, and spends Christmas Eve with an elderly museum employee named Mary Morrissey, whom he previously befriended. The new Santa takes off at 7:00 PM to deliver the gifts.

An ending scene shows the two holding dock workers receiving a large crate with shipping papers marked "E. Bunny" and arguing over the name spelling when two large rabbit ears suddenly burst through the top of the crate just before the film credits begin to roll.

Cast
 Jim Varney as Ernest P. Worrell
 Douglas Seale as Santa Claus / Seth Applegate
 Oliver Clark as Joe Carruthers, The New Santa Claus
 Noelle Parker as Pamela Trenton / Harmony Starr
 Gailard Sartain as Chuck, Storage Agent
 Bill Byrge as Bobby, Storage Agent
 Billie Bird as Mary Morrissey
 Key Howard as Immigration Agent
 Jack Swanson as Businessman
 Buddy Douglas as Pyramus The Elf
 Patty Maloney as Thisbe The Elf
 Barry Brazell as Cab Passenger
 George Kaplan as Mr. Dillis
 Robert Lesser as Marty Brock
 Zachary Bowden as Boy In The Train Station

Production

Filming locations
This was the first major feature production filmed almost entirely in Orlando, Florida, at the then-unfinished Disney-MGM Studios. Exterior scenes set at the house of Ernest's friend Vern were filmed at a house located on Residential Street at the park, and which was part of the Studio Backlot Tour until it was demolished in 2002.

The remainder of the scenes were filmed in various locations in the greater Orlando area, including Orlando International Airport, Epcot Center Drive, Lake Eola, Church Street Station and Orange Avenue in Downtown Orlando, a toll booth on the Bee Line Expressway (now known as the "Beachline Expressway"), the original Orlando Science Center which is now the John and Rita Lowndes Shakespeare Center (used as the "Orlando Children's Museum" in the film), and the Orlando AMTRAK station. 

The Lake Mary studios of then-Fox affiliate (and Meredith-owned) WOFL-TV (channel 35, which is now owned by Fox itself) were used for the Christmas Slay film scenes, as the station already had a promotional relationship with Jim Varney and the Ernest character. Other smaller scenes were filmed in Nashville.

Reception
The film was not a critical success, though it was commercially successful, being the highest-grossing of the five theatrical Ernest films. In its opening weekend, Ernest Saves Christmas was #2 at the box office behind Child's Play and grossed $5,710,734 from 1,634 theaters. Its domestic total was $28,202,109. On Rotten Tomatoes, it holds  approval rating with a 4.9/10 average rating, based on 14 reviews.

Home media
The DVD was released on September 3, 2002 from Touchstone Home Entertainment. Ernest Saves Christmas is the only Ernest film out of the original "Disney Four" to not receive a release on Blu-ray.

The film was added to Disney+ on November 26, 2021.

See also
 List of Christmas films

References

External links

 
 
 
 

1988 films
1980s children's comedy films
1980s Christmas comedy films
1980s fantasy comedy films
American children's comedy films
American Christmas comedy films
American fantasy comedy films
Ernest P. Worrell films
Films directed by John R. Cherry III
Films scored by Mark Snow
Films set in Orlando, Florida
Films shot in Florida
Films shot in Tennessee
Santa Claus in film
Touchstone Pictures films
1988 comedy films
1980s English-language films
1980s American films